The 2012 6 Hours of São Paulo was held at Autódromo José Carlos Pace, São Paulo on Saturday 15 September 2012, and was the fifth round of the 2012 FIA World Endurance Championship season. Toyota claimed its first FIA World Endurance Championship victory at the event.

Qualifying

Qualifying result
Pole position winners in each class are marked in bold.

Race

Race result
Class winners in bold. Cars failing to complete 70% of winner's distance marked as Not Classified (NC).

Note: After finishing 1st in LMGTE Am class, the No. 50 Larbre Corvette was excluded following the post-race technical checks. The team has appealed the Stewards' Decision.

References

São Paulo
6 Hours of São Paulo
2012
6 Hours of São Paulo